Gautam Raju is an Indian actor from Andhra Pradesh predominantly acted in Telugu films. He acted in more than 200 films. He got two Nandi Awards as a Best Male Comedian. He also received Rajababu award.

Early and personal life
Gautam Raju was born in Rajolu, East Godavari District of Andhra Pradesh, India. His son Krishna also entered the film industry.

Career
He moved to Hyderabad in search of a job. He was also trying to get a chance in films because of his interest in acting. He made his debut as an actor with the film Vasantha Geetam starring Akkineni Nageswara Rao. Later he acted in Sri Katna Leelalu, Coolie No.1, Gharana Mogudu gave him a good break.

Filmography

 Vasantha Geetam (1984)
 Indrudu Chandrudu (1989)
 Coolie No. 1 (1991)
 Gharana Mogudu (1992)
 President Gari Pellam (1992)
 Rajendrudu Gajendrudu (1993)
 Hello Brother (1994)
 Pokiri Raja (1995)
 Maato Pettukoku (1995)
 Sisindri (1995)
 Vinodam (1996)
 Aahvaanam (1997)
 Dongaata (1997)
 Egire Paavurama (1997)
 Ugadi (1997)
 Aahaa..! (1998)
 Auto Driver (1998)
 Manasulo Maata (1999)
 Preminche Manasu (1999)
 Premaku Velayera (1999)
 Seenu (1999)
 Kodanda Ramudu (2000)
 Sardukupodaam Randi (2000)
 Choosoddaam Randi (2000)
 Bachi (2000)
 Budget Padmanabham (2001)
 Bhalevadivi Basu (2001)
 Snehamante Idera (2001)
 Seema Simham (2002)
 Tappu Chesi Pappu Koodu (2002)
 Kalusukovalani (2002)
 Nee Thodu Kavali (2002)
 Jodi No.1 (2003)
 Juniors (2003)
 Villain (2003)
 Satta (2003)
 Kabaddi Kabaddi (2003)
 Amma Nanna O Tamila Ammayi (2003)
 Ottesi Cheputunna (2003)
 Athade Oka Sainyam (2004)
 Anandamanandamaye (2004)
 Malliswari (2004)
 Donga Dongadi (2004)
 Shankar Dada MBBS (2004)
 Keelu Gurram (2005)
 Soggadu (2005)
 Guru (2005)
 Modati Cinema (2005)
 Allare Allari (2006)
 Desamuduru (2007)
 Maharathi (2007)
 Swagatam (2008)
 Bujjigadu (2008)
 Kathanayakudu (2008)
 King (2008)
 Mesthri (2009)
 Pistha (2009)
 Ek Niranjan (2009)
 Maa Nanna Chiranjeevi (2010)
 Sab Ki Boltee Bandh (2011)
 Dookudu (2011)
 Julai (2012)
 Jai Sriram (2013)
 Chinna Cinema (2013)
 Veyyi Abaddalu (2013)
 Bunny n Cherry (2013)
 Bhimavaram Bullodu (2014)
 Aagadu (2014)
 S/O Satyamurthy (2015)
 Pataas (2015)
 Supreme (2016)
 Krishna Gaadi Veera Prema Gaadha (2016)
 Khaidi No. 150 (2017)
 Raja the Great (2017)
 Ego (2018)
 Kalki (2019)
 Oorantha Anukuntunnaru (2019)
 Tenali Ramakrishna BA. BL (2019)
 Sita Ramam'' (2022)

References

Living people
Indian male film actors
Telugu male actors
Male actors in Telugu cinema
Male actors from Andhra Pradesh
People from East Godavari district
20th-century Indian male actors
21st-century Indian male actors
Year of birth missing (living people)
Telugu comedians